Odetta is a 1963 compilation album by American folk singer Odetta. 
Odetta is the first official compilation of Odetta songs. It features songs from The Tin Angel, Odetta Sings Ballads and Blues, At the Gate of Horn and Odetta At Town Hall although not necessarily versions from those albums.

It had a poorer reputation than the above-mentioned original albums, being seen as thrown-together by the label. This LP has subsequently not been released on CD like those three albums. As a result, this album is rarer than most Odetta releases; the album is sometimes quoted as being released on "01-01-63", but this is probably not true, and rather a result of computer-automation on one music website which led to others quoting it as fact.

Track listing
Side A:
 "Greensleeves" (Traditional)
 "Midnight Special" (Traditional)
 "Easy Rider" (Traditional)
 "Alabama Bound" (Lead Belly)
 "Spiritual Trilogy":
"Oh, Freedom" (Traditional)
"Come and Go with Me" (Traditional)
"I'm on My Way'" (Traditional)

Side B:
 "Timber" (Sam Gary)
 "Deep River" (Traditional)
 "Chilly Winds" (Traditional)
 "Santy Anno" (Traditional)
 "Jack o' Diamonds" (Traditional)
 "Deep Blue Sea"(Traditional)

External links
 Odetta - "Odetta" at Music Stack
 [ AMG]

Odetta compilation albums
1963 compilation albums
Everest Records compilation albums